The 1984 Winter Olympics – officially known by the International Olympic Committee as the XIV Olympic Winter Games – were a winter multi-sport event held between 8 and 19 February 1984 in Sarajevo, Yugoslavia (currently Bosnia and Herzegovina). A total of 1,272 athletes, representing a record 49 National Olympic Committees (NOCs), competed in 39 events across 10 disciplines of 6 sports. The official program was the same as that of the 1980 Winter Olympics, with the addition of a 20-kilometer event in women's cross-country skiing. Disabled skiing was featured for the first time as an Olympic demonstration sport.

The 117 Olympic medals in dispute at these Games were awarded to athletes from 17 NOCs. The athletes from the Soviet Union collected 25 medals and secured their NOC a top spot in the overall medal count, ahead of East Germany (24 medals) and Finland (13 medals). East Germany, however, topped the gold medal count with nine medals, three more than those won by Soviet athletes. Finland, the United States and Sweden followed with four gold medals each. The host delegation won the nation's first medal at the Winter Olympics, through alpine skier Jure Franko's silver in the men's giant slalom event.

American skier Phil Mahre, runner-up in 1980, won the slalom event and saw his twin brother Steve secure the silver medal. In biathlon, Eirik Kvalfoss of Norway and Peter Angerer of West Germany won six medals between them, each securing a complete set.  
The Nordic countries displayed their strength in the cross-country skiing competition: from the 24 medals in dispute, 17 were won by athletes from Finland (8), Sweden (5), and Norway (4). Finnish skier Marja-Liisa Hämäläinen won four medals, including a gold medal sweep in the three individual cross-country distances, becoming the most successful athlete at these Games. In the men's section, Gunde Svan of Sweden also won four medals, though one less gold than Hämäläinen. Katarina Witt, a young figure skater from East Germany, narrowly defeated the reigning World champion, Rosalynn Sumners of the United States, to collect the first of two successive Olympic gold medals. The British ice dancing pair, Torvill and Dean, took the gold medal after giving performances that earned them not only the first-ever perfect scores (6.0) in Olympic ice dancing compulsories, but also a complete set of perfect artistic impression scores in the free program.

The Soviet Union dominated the ice hockey competition, winning every match to take their sixth Olympic gold in eight Winter Games. East German sledders fully demonstrated their prowess at the Trebević track. Wolfgang Hoppe and Dietmar Schauerhammer clinched gold in both bobsleigh events, while Bernhard Lehmann and Bogdan Musioł secured both silvers. Led by Steffi Martin, who won the first of her two back-to-back Olympic titles, East German lugers swept the women's singles medals. This show of strength was also observed in the women's speed skating, where East German athletes grabbed nine of the twelve medals in dispute. Four of these were won by Karin Enke (matching the total tallies of Hämäläinen and Svan), and three by Andrea Schöne – in direct competition with Enke. Speed skater Gaétan Boucher won three of Canada's four medals in Sarajevo, including two golds.

Alpine skiing

Biathlon

Bobsleigh

Cross-country skiing

Figure skating

Ice hockey

Luge

Nordic combined

Ski jumping

Speed skating

Medal leaders

Athletes that won at least two gold medals or at least three total medals are listed below.

See also
1984 Winter Olympics medal table

References

External links

1984
Medalists

Winter Olympic medalists 1984